Nathan Lee Graham (born September 9, 1968) is an American actor and singer. He has been the originator of over 17 roles on stage and screen. Currently he is "Hermes" in the North American tour of the hit musical Hadestown. He is most known for the films Zoolander, Zoolander 2, Sweet Home Alabama, and Hitch. 

On the small screen, he has been seen in The Comeback, Scrubs, Absolutely Fabulous, Law & Order: Special Victims Unit, Broad City and as Bernard in the Fox comedy LA to Vegas. He also appeared as Francois on the CW Riverdale spin-off Katy Keene, and currently as Draque Noir on the Hulu series Woke. Graham will next be seen as Clive DeWitt in the feature film Theater Camp.

His stage appearances include the original Broadway casts of Tony Awards and Grammy Award  nominated The Wild Party and in the original Broadway cast of the Tony Awards nominated Priscilla, Queen of the Desert. Mr. Graham received a 2017 Lucille Lortel nomination for Outstanding Featured Actor in a Musical for The View UpStairs. In 2016, he received the IRNE award for Best Supporting Actor in a Play for The Colored Museum. Graham also received a Drama League Award nomination for the role of Rey-Rey in the off-Broadway production of Tarell Alvin McCraney's Wig Out. Nathan also won a Los Angeles Drama Critics Circle Award for Best Feature Performer in a Musical in The Wild Party LA Premiere in 2005. In 2005, he earned a Best Classical Album Grammy Award for Songs of Innocence and of Experience as a soloist.

Nathan Lee Graham is a graduate of Webster University in St. Louis, MO. Graham won the José Esteban Muñoz Award from CLAGS: The Center for LGBTQ Studies at the Graduate Center, CUNY in 2017, recognizing his activism promoting queer studies outside of academia.

Filmography

Films

TV

References

External links

1968 births
20th-century American male actors
21st-century American male actors
Film producers from Missouri
American male film actors
American male musical theatre actors
American male television actors
American male voice actors
American gay actors
Living people
Male actors from St. Louis